Only Hits may refer to:

Only Hits (The Ventures album) 1973
Only Hits (2006 Warner Music Group album) compilation on Rhino Records 2006
Only the Hits Billie Jo Spears discography 1981
Only the Hits The Ventures discography 1992